Krez is a surname. Notable people with the surname include: 

Conrad Krez (1828–1897), German politician and military officer
Frederick W. Krez (1899–1969), American politician and businessman

See also
 Krez (instrument)